Salvatore Chiantia (born 1969) is the mayor of Riesi, Sicily.  He is a member of the Democratic Party.

References

1969 births
Living people
Democratic Party (Italy) politicians
21st-century Italian politicians
Mayors of places in Sicily